Witki  (Vytky) is a village in the administrative district of Gmina Stary Dzików, within Lubaczów County, Subcarpathian Voivodeship, in south-eastern Poland.

References

Witki